This is a list of mayors of Salt Lake City, Utah, USA. Salt Lake City was incorporated on January 6, 1851. The mayor of Salt Lake City is a non-partisan position.

See also
Mayoral elections in Salt Lake City

References

Harold Schindler, (November 10, 1991) "Mayoral History Awaits Corradini Chapter: Colorful Mayoral History Awaits Unprecedented Corradini Chapter".  The Salt Lake Tribune, p. A1.

Salt Lake City

1851 establishments in Utah Territory